The Abbot of Iona was the head of Iona Abbey during the Middle Ages and the leader of the monastic community of Iona, as well as the overlord of scores of monasteries in both Scotland and Ireland, including Durrow, Kells and, until the Synod of Whitby, Lindisfarne. It was one of the most prestigious clerical positions in Dark Age Europe, and was visited by kings and bishops of the Picts, Franks and English. The Ionan abbots also had the status of Comarba of Colum Cille, i.e. the successors of that Saint, Columba.

Iona's position as head of the Columban network (familia) of churches declined over time, with abbots based at Derry, Raphoe, Kells and Dunkeld. In Scotland, the abbots of Dunkeld ruled much of central Scotland in the 11th century, and functioned as some of the most important politicians of northern Britain. One of the abbots, Crínán, married Bethóc ingen Maíl Coluim, the daughter of King Máel Coluim II, and became the progenitor of the so-called House of Dunkeld, which ruled Scotland until the later thirteenth century. Dunkeld became a bishopric, and the monks based at Inchcolm Abbey became Augustinians.

At the beginning of the thirteenth century, the monks of Iona adopted the Benedictine rule. Iona was re-endowed in 1203 by Raghnall mac Somhairle, son of Somerled, king of Argyll and the Isles.

List of abbots of Iona to 891

List of comarbai Coluim Cille and abbots of Iona, 891–1099
During the abbacies of Diarmait and Indrechtach, almost certainly because of Viking attacks, the relics of Columba were moved to other monastic houses in the Columban familia, such as Kells, Raphoe and Dunkeld. The position of abbot on Iona ceases to have the same significance within the Columban monastic familia, and many comarbai are not based on the island.

List of comarbai Coluim Cille at Kells and Derry

None of the following comarbai Coluim Cille are based at Iona, but rather Kells and Derry.

List of Benedictine abbots of Iona

List of abbot-commendators

Notes

References

External links
http://foundationsirishculture.ie/record/?id=52

Iona
Iona
Iona, Benedictine
Irish abbots